The Valhalla Murders (literally "violation") is an eight-episode police procedural television series produced in Iceland, originally airing there in 2019, then released worldwide in 2020 on Netflix and airing for free on BBC Four in the UK.

This is the second Icelandic series to be featured on Netflix, Trapped (Ófærð) being the first. The plot is loosely based on a real-life incident. As described in an article on the website MEAWW, "In the late 1940s, an almost similar event took place in remote Iceland. A state-run institution ... housed troubled, young boys, aged between seven and 14, where they were beaten and abused by the staff. Although in reality there was no murder, per se, as shown in the series, it caused quite a noise and the boys were eventually compensated in monetary terms."

Cast
 Nína Dögg Filippusdóttir as Kata
 Björn Thors as Arnar
 Sigurður Skúlason as Magnus
 Bergur Ebbi Benediktsson as Erlingur
 Tinna Hrafnsdóttir as Helga
 Edda Björgvinsdóttir as Svava
 Arndís Hrönn Egilsdóttir as Hugrún
 Anna Gunndís Guðmundsdóttir as Selma
 Aldís Amah Hamilton as Dísa

Episodes

Reception 

The series received mixed reviews.  Writing in The Sydney Morning Herald, Brad Newsome says: "Gutsy performances and judicious rationing of the scenery make for terrific viewing." However, Euan Ferguson of The Guardian writes: "Even halfway through it hasn’t quite got going: despite the dramatic backdrops, and a few stalwart performances, the word is glacial." Writing in The List, Brian Donaldson concludes his review: "The Valhalla Murders is certainly distracting enough, but while it aims to send chills straight down your bones, this Icelandic drama is ultimately a lukewarm bowl of kjotsupa."

See also
 Nordic noir

References

External links
 
 
 RUV (Icelandic)
 RUV (English)

2019 Icelandic television series debuts
Icelandic drama television series